Mostafa Mohamed may refer to :
Mostafa Mohamed (footballer), Egyptian football forward
Mostafa Mohamed (militant), Egyptian-Australian member of Jabhat al-Nusra
Mostafa Mohamed (wrestler), Egyptian-Greco-Roman wrestler
Mustafa Mohamed, Somali-Swedish athlete

See also
Mustafa Mohamed Moalim, Somali pilot
Mostafa Mohammad-Najjar, Iranian politician
Mustafa Mohamed Fadhil, Al-Qaeda operative
Mustapa Mohamed, Malaysia politician